Mix TV was a Brazilian television music channel aimed at young people. The channel was owned by Grupo Mix de Comunicação, which also owns the Mix FM radio station. Mix TV is run by Fernando di Genio Barbosa and first aired in January 2005.

History 
The station began as TV Jovem Pan, founded in 1991, by entrepreneurs Antônio Augusto Amaral de Carvalho, owner of Rádio Jovem Pan and Hamilton Lucas de Oliveira, owner of IBF (Indústria Brasileira de Formulários). Oliveira had previously been involved in the defunct network Manchete.

The station was renamed as Mix TV with the idea that it would be a television version of the Mix FM radio station, which first started in 1995.

In 2009, the station expanded its programming, including new shows like Hip Hop Mix, Hot Clipes, Insight and Banda X Banda.

In the same year, three new VJs began presenting on the channel: Julie, followed by Xis and Max Fivelinha.

Broadcast television 
This is a list of the Mix TV affiliates, owned stations, and relays. Bolds are owned-and-operated stations, and italics are affiliates. The others are relay stations. Also is possible watch Mix TV in your website.

Amazonas
 Manaus - Channel 51 UHF

Ceará
 Fortaleza - Channel 50 UHF

Espírito Santo 
 Vitória - Channel 44 UHF

Federal District
 Brasília - Channel 17 UHF

Paraná
 Curitiba - Channel 19 UHF

Pernambuco
 Recife - Channel 43 UHF

Rio de Janeiro
 Rio de Janeiro - Channel 16 UHF

Rio Grande do Sul
 Porto Alegre - Channel 40 UHF

Santa Catarina
 Florianópolis - Channel 36 UHF

São Paulo
 Águas de Lindóia - Channel 21 UHF
 Araçatuba - Channel 28 UHF
 Arealva - Channel 15 UHF
 Assis - Channel 41 UHF
 Botucatu - Channel 14 UHF
 Catanduva - Channel 21 UHF
 Fernandópolis - Channel 21 UHF
 Franca - Channel 45 UHF
 General Salgado - Channel 21 UHF
 Ibitinga - Channel 45 UHF
 Presidente Prudente - Channel 14 UHF
 São Paulo - Channel 14 UHF

Cable and satellite television 
 Claro TV - Channel 127
 CTBC TV - Channel 707 (Minas Gerais, Goiás, São Paulo and Mato Grosso do Sul)
 NET - Channel 12 (Santos) and Channel 22 (Brasília)
 Oi TV - Channel 141
 Viamax - Channel 33 (Florianópolis, Joinville and Itajaí)
 Vivo TV (cable) - Channel 12 (São Paulo and Curitiba)
 Vivo TV (satellite) - Channel 234 (São Paulo)

List of programs broadcast by Mix TV
This is a list of programs broadcast by Mix TV, a Brazilian musical television network.

Current programming

Upcoming programming
 Álbuns Clássicos
 Banda X Banda
 Baú do Rock

Former programming

See also 
 List of programs broadcast by Mix TV
 MTV Brasil

References

External links 
  
 
 Mix TV's shows

Defunct television channels in Brazil
Music television channels
Television channels and stations established in 2005
Television channels and stations disestablished in 2017
2005 establishments in Brazil
2017 disestablishments in Brazil
Portuguese-language television networks
Music organisations based in Brazil